UNA Europe Network is a network of United Nations Associations (UNAs) based in Europe.

United Nations Associations are Non-Governmental Organisations, usually with individual and organizational members. They are peoples movements with the common goal of working for a better and stronger United Nations. Often they work with information, advocacy, international cooperation and fundraising. There are over 100 UNA's around the world and are presently organized in a world federation, World Federation of United Nations Associations (WFUNA).

There are currently 33 UNAs in the UNA Europe Network:

 Armenia
 Austria
 Belgium
 Bulgaria
 Croatia
 Cyprus
 Czech Republic
 Denmark
 Estonia
 Finland
 France
 Georgia
 Germany
 Greece
 Hungary
 Iceland
 Israel
 Italy
 Lithuania
 Luxembourg
 Montenegro
 Netherlands
 Norway
 Portugal
 Romania
 Russia
 Serbia
 Slovenia
 Spain
 Sweden
 Switzerland
 Turkey
 United Kingdom

References

External links
 

World Federation of United Nations Associations